Pingliang railway station is the main railway station serving Pingliang, Gansu, China. It was built in 1995 and is administered by the China Railway Lanzhou Group. The station is served by the Baoji–Zhongwei railway, located 203 km from the Baoji terminus and 308 km from the Zhongwei terminus.

References 

Railway stations in Gansu
Railway stations in China opened in 1995